The blackspot shiner (Notropis atrocaudalis) is a species of freshwater fish in the family Cyprinidae. It is endemic to the United States and found in the lower Brazos River drainage of eastern Texas east to the Calcasieu River drainage of southwestern Louisiana and the Red River drainage of southeastern Oklahoma, southwestern Arkansas, and northwestern Louisiana. It grows to  total length.

References 

 Robert Jay Goldstein, Rodney W. Harper, Richard Edwards: American Aquarium Fishes. Texas A&M University Press 2000, p. 89

Notropis
Freshwater fish of the United States
Endemic fauna of the United States
Taxa named by Barton Warren Evermann
Fish described in 1892